Berlin University or University of Berlin may refer to:

Humboldt University of Berlin (HU Berlin), founded in 1809 as University of Berlin; renamed Friedrich Wilhelm University in 1828; renamed Humboldt-Universitat in 1949
Technical University of Berlin (TU Berlin), founded 1879
Free University of Berlin (FU Berlin), founded 1948

See also
List of universities, colleges, and research institutions in Berlin